Rogoznica is a municipality and a popular tourist village on the Dalmatian coast in Croatia that lies in the southernmost part of the Šibenik-Knin County, in a deep bay sheltered from wind, about 30 km from Šibenik. In the 2001 census, the population of the village was 2,391, with 96% declaring themselves Croats. It is occasionally called Šibenska Rogoznica to distinguish it from Lokva Rogoznica, another tourist resort in Dalmatia.

The part of Rogoznica that lies on the mainland was populated already in 1390. In 1518 the inhabitants fled in front of the Turkish army to safety of the nearby islet.

Climate

The warmest months are July and August when the air temperature is between 25 °C and 35 °C (77 °F - 95 °F) and the sea temperature reaches up to 28 °C (83 °F). Rain is rare.

Notable people
 Rahim Ademi, a Croatian general during the Homeland War, was stationed in Rogoznica for a time.

References

External links

Populated places in Šibenik-Knin County
Populated coastal places in Croatia
Municipalities of Croatia